Jaime Rafael Martínez Portillo  (born 18 September 1947) is a retired footballer from El Salvador. During his career he played for Once Berlinés, Alianza F.C., C.D. FAS, Platense and Baygon ADET.

International career
Portillo represented his country at the 1970 FIFA World Cup in Mexico and in 1 FIFA World Cup qualification match.

References

1947 births
Living people
Association football forwards
Salvadoran footballers
El Salvador international footballers
1970 FIFA World Cup players
Alianza F.C. footballers